The 2014–15 Southern Counties East Football League season (known as the 2014–15 Hurliman Southern Counties East Football League for sponsorship reasons) was the 2nd under the current name and 49th overall in the history of the Southern Counties East Football League, a football competition in England.

League table

The league consisted of 16 clubs from the previous season along with four new clubs:
Crowborough Athletic, transferred from the Sussex County League
Croydon, transferred from the Combined Counties League
Erith & Belvedere, relegated from the Isthmian League
Lingfield, transferred from the Sussex County League

League table

Results

References

2014–15
9